Jan Andrejašič (born 16 September 1995) is a Slovenian footballer who plays as a full-back for Gorica.

References

1995 births
Living people
Slovenian footballers
Association football fullbacks
Slovenia youth international footballers
Slovenia under-21 international footballers
FC Koper players
NK Celje players
NK Olimpija Ljubljana (2005) players
ND Gorica players
Slovenian PrvaLiga players